There has been Catholic education in the Diocese of Parramatta since before the Second World War. There are 76 Catholic systemic schools in the diocese (54 primary and 22 secondary) with a total student population of around 41,000.  There are also six non-systemic or congregational (independent) Catholic schools.

History

Early expansion
A growing population saw many schools open in the years before the Second World War. Built and staffed without government financial assistance, the schools served Catholic communities in Blacktown, East Granville, Guildford,  and Castle Hill.

Baby-boom years
Australia’s population grew rapidly in the 1950s and 1960s. An ambitious school building program was successfully pursued to cater for new families in many developing areas, including Lalor Park, Seven Hills, Westmead and Kingswood.

Government support
Some financial relief came to Catholic schools in the 1960s with the funding of science and library facilities. However it was the 1970s that brought a new era of Australian Government funding for all Australian schools, based on the principles of equality and diversity.

Many new schools opened in the decades that followed. These served numerous parishes, including Winston Hills, North Rocks, Kenthurst, Cranebrook and St Clair.

Education

Schools 

Bede Polding College, Windsor South
Bethany Catholic Primary, Glenmore Park
Caroline Chisholm College, Glenmore Park
Catherine McAuley, Westmead
CathWest Innovation College, Mt Druitt/ Emu Plains
Cerdon College, Merrylands
Chisholm Catholic Primary, Bligh Park
Christ the King Primary, North Rocks
Corpus Christi Primary, Cranebrook
Delany College, Granville
Emmaus Catholic College, Kemps Creek
Gilroy College, Castle Hill
Good Shepherd Primary, Plumpton
Holy Cross Primary, Glenwood
Holy Family Primary, Granville East
Holy Family Primary, Emerton
Holy Family Primary, Luddenham
Holy Spirit Primary, St Clair
Holy Trinity Primary, Granville
Marian Catholic College, Kenthurst
Mary Immaculate Primary, Quakers Hill
Mary MacKillop Primary, Penrith South
Penola Catholic College, Emu Plains
Nagle College, Blacktown South
Oakhill College, Castle Hill
Our Lady of Lebanon College - Primary, Harris Park
Our Lady of Lebanon College - Secondary, Harris Park
Our Lady of Lourdes Primary, Baulkham Hills South
Our Lady of Lourdes Primary, Seven Hills
Our Lady of Mercy College, Parramatta
Our Lady of Mt Carmel Primary, Wentworthville
Our Lady of the Angels, Rouse Hill
Our Lady of the Nativity Primary, Lawson
Our Lady of the Rosary Primary, Kellyville
Our Lady of the Rosary Primary, St Marys
Our Lady of the Way Primary, Emu Plains
Our Lady Queen of Peace Primary, Greystanes
Parramatta Marist High, Westmead
Patrician Brothers' College, Blacktown
Patrician Brothers' College, Fairfield
Sacred Heart Primary, Mount Druitt South
Sacred Heart Primary, Westmead
Santa Sophia Catholic College, Gables
St Agnes Catholic High, Rooty Hill
St Aidan's Primary, Rooty Hill
St Andrews College, Marayong
St Andrews College, Marayong - Holy Family Campus, Marayong
St Andrews College, Marayong - John Paul II Campus, Marayong
St Andrews Primary, Marayong
St Angela's Primary, Castle Hill
St Anthony's Primary, Girraween
St Bernadette's Primary, Castle Hill
St Bernadette's Primary, Lalor Park
St Bernadette's Primary, Dundas
St Canice's Primary, Katoomba
St Clare's Catholic High, Hassall Grove
St Columba's Catholic College, Springwood
St Dominic's College, Penrith
St Finbar's Primary, Glenbrook
St Francis of Assisi Primary, Glendenning
St Gabriel's School for Hearing Impaired Children, Castle Hill
St John Paul II Catholic College - Nirimba Campus, Quakers Hill
St John Paul II Catholic College - Schofields Campus, Schofields
St John XXIII Catholic College, Stanhope Gardens
St John Vianney's Primary, Doonside
St John's Primary, Riverstone
St Joseph's Primary, Kingswood
St Joseph's Primary, Schofields
St Madeleine's Primary, Kenthurst
St Margaret Mary's Primary, Merrylands
St Mary's Primary, Rydalmere
St Matthew's Primary, Windsor
St Michael's Primary, Baulkham Hills
St Michael's Primary, Blacktown South
St Monica's Primary, North Parramatta
St Monica's Primary, Richmond
St Nicholas of Myra Primary, Penrith
St Oliver's Primary, Harris Park
St Patrick's Marist College, Dundas
St Patrick's Primary, Guildford
St Patrick's Primary, Parramatta
St Patrick's Primary, Blacktown
St Paul the Apostle Primary, Winston Hills
St Pauls Catholic College, Greystanes
St Thomas Aquinas Primary, Springwood
Trinity Catholic Primary, Kemps Creek
Xavier Catholic College, Llandilo

Executive Director 
The Executive Director of Schools in the Parramatta Diocese is Jack de Groot. Mr de Groot brings significant leadership experience in senior governance roles in healthcare, aid, tertiary education and social services where he has demonstrated a strong focus on Catholic values, social outreach and mission.

Bishop 

Most Reverend Vincent Long Van Nguyen OFM Conv DD STL is the third Bishop of Parramatta. Appointed on 5 May 2016, Bishop Vincent was installed as the fourth Bishop of Parramatta at St Patrick’s Cathedral, Parramatta on 16 June 2016.

Enrolment 
Catholic Schools Parramatta Diocese accept enrolments from students who are not Catholic. All students enrolled in a Catholic school should be willing to participate in the religious activities of the school.

In the Parramatta Diocese, enrolment preference is given, in order, to:
 children of Catholic families who live in the local parish
 children of Catholic families from other parishes
 non-Catholics, in accordance to the school's enrolment vacancies

Siblings of children already enrolled in the school are considered by the same criteria above. However, within each of these categories, a sibling of a child already enrolled has preference over an applicant who does not have a sibling enrolled in the school.

Special consideration may be given to children of non-Catholic families for a number of reasons, after discussion with the school principal.

Funding 
Catholic Schools Parramatta Diocese schools are funded by the Australian and NSW governments, as well as through modest school fees and fundraising.

See also

 Roman Catholic Diocese of Parramatta
 List of Catholic schools in New South Wales

References

External links 
Catholic Schools Parramatta Diocese 

Education in New South Wales
 
Roman Catholic Diocese of Parramatta